Nora Springs is a city that is partially in Cerro Gordo and Floyd counties in the U.S. state of Iowa, along the Shell Rock River. The population was 1,369 at the time of the 2020 census.

The Cerro Gordo County portion of Nora Springs is part of the Mason City Micropolitan Statistical Area.

History

Nora Springs was founded in 1857 and was incorporated in 1875.

Geography
Nora Springs is located at  (43.144010, −93.008929).

Demographics

2010 Census
As of the census of 2010, there were 1,431 people, 577 households, and 388 families residing in the city. The racial makeup of the city was 99.1% White, 0.1% African American, 0.2% Asian, 0.1% from other races, and 0.6% from two or more races. Hispanic or Latino of any race were 1.4% of the population.

There were 577 households, of which 32.2% had children under the age of 18 living with them, 54.9% were married couples living together, 9.9% had a female householder with no husband present, 2.4% had a male householder with no wife present, and 32.8% were non-families. 28.4% of all households were made up of individuals, and 13.4% had someone living alone who was 65 years of age or older. The average household size was 2.37 and the average family size was 2.91.

The median age in the city was 41.2 years. 24% of residents were under the age of 18; 7.1% were between the ages of 18 and 24; 23.3% were from 25 to 44; 27.5% were from 45 to 64; and 18% were 65 years of age or older. The gender makeup of the city was 49.0% male and 51.0% female.

2000 Census
As of the census of 2000, there were 1,532 people, 597 households, and 401 families residing in the city. The racial makeup of the city was 99.54% White, 0.07% African American, 0.13% Native American, 0.07% from other races, and 0.20% from two or more races. Hispanic or Latino of any race were 0.85% of the population.

There were 597 households, out of which 31.8% had children under the age of 18 living with them, 55.9% were married couples living together, 7.9% had a female householder with no husband present, and 32.8% were non-families. 29.6% of all households were made up of individuals, and 14.1% had someone living alone who was 65 years of age or older. The average household size was 2.39 and the average family size was 2.95.

24.0% are under the age of 18, 7.8% from 18 to 24, 26.6% from 25 to 44, 23.2% from 45 to 64, and 18.4% who were 65 years of age or older. The median age was 40 years. For every 100 females, there were 95.2 males. For every 100 females age 18 and over, there were 89.7 males.

The median income for a household in the city was $34,926, and the median income for a family was $43,516. Males had a median income of $28,043 versus $21,536 for females. The per capita income for the city was $16,246. About 3.0% of families and 5.3% of the population were below the poverty line, including 3.9% of those under age 18 and 7.5% of those age 65 or over.

Nora Springs Buffalo Days 
The last week of June always marks Nora Springs Buffalo Days. Festivities include a parade, entertainment at Boulder Park such as food vendors, and inflatable rides. Other activities include a 5K Run/Walk and Bingo. At the Fire Department the Fireman's Ball is held from 9 p.m. to 1 a.m.

Education
Its public schools are operated by the Central Springs Community School District, established on July 1, 2011, by the merger of North Central Community School District and Nora Springs–Rock Falls Community School District. The athletic teams are the Central Springs Panthers.

All high school students in the district, grades 9-12, as well as K-3 elementary students from the Plymouth, Manly, and Hanlontown area attend school at the Manly site. Meanwhile, all middle school students, grades 4-8, plus grades K-3 from the Nora Springs and Rock Falls area, plus those from the unincorported community of Portland, attend school at the Nora Springs site. The school colors are black and blue, the mascot being a panther.

Notable people
Louis Bauman Brethren, minister, writer, and Bible conference speaker, and was born in Nora Springs.
Arthur Gratias, Iowa State Senator, farmer, and educator, was born in Nora Springs.
John P. Gregg LSU college football coach, Wisconsin quarterback, and died in Nora Springs.

See also
National Register of Historic Places listings in Floyd County, Iowa

References

External links

Nora Springs Homepage
City-Data Comprehensive statistical data and more about Nora Springs
History of Iowa From the Earliest Times to the Beginning of the Twentieth Century – Floyd County

 

Cities in Cerro Gordo County, Iowa
Cities in Floyd County, Iowa
Cities in Iowa
Mason City, Iowa micropolitan area